James "Skip" Wilson (October 8, 1929 – July 26, 2022) was an American college baseball head coach.

As the winningest coach in Owls sports history, Wilson was inducted into three different sports Halls of Fame: the Temple Athletics Hall of Fame in 1981, the American Baseball Coaches Association Hall of Fame in 1994, and the Pennsylvania Sports Hall of Fame in 1994.

Early life 
Born in the Philadelphia suburb of Germantown on October 8, 1929, Wilson was a standout three sport star at nearby St. John's High School, graduating in 1948. Wilson earned a basketball scholarship to Georgetown University, but he would drop out, opting instead to play minor league baseball.

After serving in the US Army, Wilson returned to school at Temple University, earning both a bachelor's degree in 1958 and a master's degree in health and physical education in 1961.

In addition to his extensive collegiate coaching career (which also included a stint as the freshman basketball team at Temple), Wilson taught physical education and driver training at Roxborough High School of Philadelphia for 34 years.

Coaching career 
Wilson coached the Temple Owls baseball team for 46 seasons, taking over for future Temple athletic director Ernie Casale in 1960. He achieved 1,034 wins, reached the NCAA Tournament 12 times, and coached more than 100 professional baseball players.

Before joining the A-10, Wilson's Owls squads played in both the Middle Atlantic Conference (1960-1974) and East Coast Conference (1975-1982). Temple won four MAC conference titles, eight ECC East division titles and five ECC conference titles.

Finishing 10-1 in MAC play, the 1972 Owls reached their first College World Series, defeating Penn State twice (including 4-3 in the final) and LIU to win the District 2 Championship. They would lose 2-1 to Oklahoma (led by Joe Simpson), then defeat Iowa (led by Jim Sundberg) and Connecticut in the loser's bracket before falling to eventual champion Southern Cal 4-3 in 10 innings to finish third. The Owls were led by future Major League pitching coach and manager Joe Kerrigan.

In 1977, Temple went unbeaten in ECC play and won the Northeast Regional tournament, finishing unbeaten with wins over UConn, Catholic, Cornell and St. John's to reach the 1977 College World Series (the last time the program would ever reach Omaha). Future Major League pitcher Pete Filson led the Owls.

Other notable Owl baseball players under Wilson included John Marzano, Jeff Manto, Ed Wade, Bobby Higginson and Steve Javie.

Wilson's 1,034 wins are the most of any coach in Temple University history. He earned his 1,000 career win on March 14, 2004 as Temple defeated Manhattan 10-9.

He received the Atlantic 10 Coach of the Year award in 1989 and 2001, winning the Atlantic 10 Conference title two times and the Atlantic 10 East Division three times.

Temple's former home baseball venue, Skip Wilson Field, was named for Wilson. However, the Owls baseball program was discontinued in 2014, much to Wilson's expressed dismay.

Skip Wilson died from stroke complications on July 26, 2022.

Head coaching record

References

1929 births
2022 deaths
Georgetown Hoyas men's basketball players
Sportspeople from Philadelphia
Temple Owls baseball coaches
Temple University alumni
Basketball players from Philadelphia